Route 161 is a New Brunswick highway that runs for  from a junction with Route 120 at Caron Brook, to the International Bridge at Clair; in Madawaska County. The route connects to U.S. Route 1 and Maine State Route 161 across the Saint John River in Fort Kent, Maine.

Route 161 was part of Route 205 until 1999.

See also
Info

References

New Brunswick provincial highways
Roads in Madawaska County, New Brunswick